Oi Mikromesaioi is a Greek comedy series. It was aired by Mega Channel during the 1992-1993 television season.

External links
 

Mega Channel original programming
Greek-language television shows
1992 Greek television series debuts
1993 Greek television series endings
1990s Greek television series
Greek comedy television series